Quinn C. Marston (born May 31, 1988) is an American musician and artist. His music has been featured on TV shows such as One Tree Hill, Ghost Whisperer, and The Gates. He has performed regularly at various New York City clubs including the Knitting Factory in Brooklyn and The National Underground in Manhattan. His music has been compared to bands such as The Breeders, Belly, The Cure, Liz Phair, Karen O., a "punkified" Kimya Dawson, and Connie Converse.

Marston is the son of public service advertising director Ginna Marston and the grandson of advertising copywriter Frederick D. Sulcer.

Music reviews
Music reviewers have described Marston's music as "instantly catchy, energetic pop rock tunes," "upbeat," and "crunchy." Guitar World editor Brad Tolinski described Marston's lyrics as "unique" and that he has "something to say" which is "worth listening to." My Old Kentucky Blog wrote that his music has "ragged urgency."

His vocals have been described as "over-enunciated," "understated," as having a "shy slur to sexy shout" with an "endearing loneliness" and a "quirky confidence."

His lyrics have been described by critic Addy Danti of Buzz Danti as "witty and wise beyond their years, set to grungy melodies that encapsulate a youthful angst. Another reviewer wrote that the "title track spins and jams with ferocity that doesn't take away from Marston's melodic quality." Another described his lyrics as "sleepily whimsical poems" while another described them as "quirky and charming."

Personal life
Before 2013, Marston identified as a female, and since 2013, identified as a male. In 2019, he identifies as trans man.

Discography
 Can You Hear Me See Me Now?, released October 2010, Ernest Jenning (label)

References

External links
 Official Website: QMarston.com
 Official website (archived)

1988 births
Living people
21st-century American singers
21st-century LGBT people
Abstract painters
LGBT people from New York (state)
American LGBT singers
People from Westchester County, New York
Singers from New York (state)
Songwriters from New York (state)
Transgender singers
Transgender male musicians